In the geologic timescale, the Kungurian is an age or stage of the Permian. It is the latest or upper of four subdivisions of the Cisuralian Epoch or Series. It was preceded by the Artinskian and followed by the Roadian. It corresponds roughly to the Leonardian Stage, covering the span from 280 to 270.6 ± 0.7 Ma in the North American system.

Stratigraphy
The Kungurian is named after the Russian city of Kungur in Perm Krai. The stage was introduced into scientific literature by Russian geologist Alexandr Antonovich Stukenberg (Alexander Stuckenberg) in 1890.

The base of the Kungurian Stage is defined as the place in the stratigraphic record where fossils of conodont species Neostreptognathodus pnevi and Neostreptognathodus exculptus first appear. As of 2009, there was no agreement yet on a global reference profile (a GSSP) for the base of the Kungurian. The top of the Kungurian (the base of the Roadian and the Guadalupian series) is defined as the place in the stratigraphic record where fossils of conodont species Jinogondolella nanginkensis first appear.

The Kungurian contains three conodont biozones:
zone of Neostreptognathodus sulcoplicatus
zone of Neostreptognathodus prayi
zone of Neostreptognathodus pnevi

References

External links 
 GeoWhen Database - Kungurian
 Upper Paleozoic stratigraphic chart at the website of the subcommission for stratigraphic information of the ICS

 
Permian geochronology
.